Muliphein or Muliphen may refer to:

 The traditional name for the star Gamma Canis Majoris
 USS Muliphen (AKA-61), a U.S. Navy cargo ship